Innisfail-Sylvan Lake is a provincial electoral district in Alberta, Canada. It is one of 87 current districts mandated to return a single member to the Legislative Assembly of Alberta using the first past the post method of voting.

The district was created in the 1993 boundary redistribution from the old Innisfail electoral district that had existed since the province was created in 1905. It is located in rural central Alberta just south of the city of Red Deer. Communities include Innisfail, Sylvan Lake, Penhold, Bowden, Delburne, Elnora, Springbrook, Spruce View, Markerville and Dickson.

In recent decades the district has elected Progressive Conservative candidates with strong majorities, but in the 2012 election the district elected Wildrose Candidate Kerry Towle. After crossing the floor to the Progressive Conservatives Towle was defeated in the 2015 election by Wildrose candidate Don MacIntyre.

History
The electoral district was created in the 1993 boundary redistribution primarily from the old electoral district of Innisfail. The 2010 boundary redistribution saw a portion of the district west of Sylvan Lake transferred to Rimbey-Rocky Mountain House-Sundre and portions of land that were outside of the city of Red Deer in the Red Deer-North transferred in.

Boundary history

Representation history

The electoral district was created in the 1993 boundary redistribution from the old Innisfail riding. The first election held in 1993 saw incumbent Progressive Conservative Gary Severtson win the electoral district with over 50% of the popular vote. He was re-elected again in the 1997 general election, with an increase in his margin of victory nearly winning a landslide. Severtson retired at dissolution in 2001.

Luke Ouellette won his first election as a Progressive Conservative candidate in 2001. In that election he won nearly 75% of the popular vote to hold the seat. He was re-elected to a second term in the 2004 election. He fended off a strong challenge from Alberta Alliance leader Randy Thorsteinson.

Premier Ralph Klein appointed Ouelette to the cabinet after the 2004 election. He ran for a third term in the 2008 general election and won a larger vote share. However, he was defeated in 2012 by Wildrose candidate Kerry Towle.

Towle subsequently crossed the floor to the governing PCs in protest of Danielle Smith's leadership of the Wildrose Party, and would be followed shortly thereafter by Smith herself and a majority of the Wildrose caucus. Although most of these floor-crossers were not able to stand in the 2015 election, Towle defended her seat as a Progressive Conservative, but was soundly defeated by Wildrose candidate Don MacIntyre. He changed affiliations when the two parties merged, sitting with the new United Conservative (UCP) caucus for one sitting of the Legislature.

However, allegations against MacIntyre in early 2018 prompted him to resign from caucus, and shortly thereafter as MLA. The resulting by-election was won easily by UCP candidate Devin Dreeshen, son of MP Earl Dreeshen.

Election results

Graphical summary

Elections in the 2010s

Elections in the 2000s

|}

|}

|}

Elections in the 1990s

|}

|}

Senate nominee results

2004 Senate nominee election district results
Voters had the option of selecting 4 Candidates on the Ballot

2012 Senate nominee election district results

Student Vote results

2004 election

On November 19, 2004 a Student Vote was conducted at participating Alberta schools to parallel the 2004 Alberta general election results. The vote was designed to educate students and simulate the electoral process for persons who have not yet reached the legal majority. The vote was conducted in 80 of the 83 provincial electoral districts with students voting for actual election candidates. Schools with a large student body that reside in another electoral district had the option to vote for candidates outside of the electoral district then where they were physically located.

2012 election

References

External links 
Electoral Divisions Act 2003
Demographics for Innisfail-Sylvan Lake
Riding Map for Innisfail-Sylvan Lake
Website of the Legislative Assembly of Alberta
Student Vote Alberta 2004

Alberta provincial electoral districts